Las Regueras (Les Regueres en Asturiano) is a municipality in the Autonomous Community of the Principality of Asturias, Spain. It is bordered on the north by Illas and Llanera, on the south by  Grado, on the west by Candamo, and on the east by Oviedo and Llanera.

Parishes
Biedes
L'Escampleru
Santuyanu 
Sotu
Tresmonte
Valdunu

Politics

Notable people
Ramón González (1888–1952), socialist trade union leader

References

External links
Federación Asturiana de Concejos 
Quesería Artesanal Llazana 

Municipalities in Asturias